The 12th Independent Battery, Wisconsin Light Artillery, was an artillery battery that served in the Union Army during the American Civil War.

Service
The 12th Independent Battery was mustered into service at St. Louis, Missouri, in February, 1862 as a part of a Missouri light artillery regiment under the authority of Governor Henry but was transferred to Wisconsin state service.

The battery was mustered out on June 26, 1865.

Total strength and casualties
The 12th Independent Battery initially recruited 99 officers and men.  An additional 212 men were recruited as replacements, for a total of 311
men.

The battery suffered 1 officer and 10 enlisted men killed in action or died of wounds, and 23 enlisted men who died of disease, for a total of 34 fatalities.

Most of the battle losses occurred at the Battle of Allatoona Pass, October 5, 1864, where the 12th was the only Union artillery present.  First Lieutenant Marcus Amsden, who commanded the battery in this fight, fell mortally wounded; Sergeant Sylvester Bartow, Corporal Alva P. Hamilton, and Private David C. Davey were killed in action, and Privates Charles C. Baker, Joseph W. Chase, and Samuel H. Doolittle also died of their wounds.

Commanders
 Captain William A. Pile - March 1, 1862 - July 18, 1862, when his commission was revoked
 Captain William Zickerick - July 18, 1862 - June 7, 1865

See also

 List of Wisconsin Civil War units
 Wisconsin in the American Civil War

Notes

References
The Civil War Archive

Military units and formations established in 1862
Military units and formations disestablished in 1865
Units and formations of the Union Army from Wisconsin
Wisconsin
1862 establishments in Wisconsin